Roger Twysden may  refer to:
Sir Roger Twysden, 2nd Baronet (1597 – 1672), an English historian and politician
Sir Roger Twysden, 10th Baronet (1894-1934), of the Twysden baronets
Sir Roger Twisden, 2nd Baronet (c 1640-1703), MP for Rochester